Nora Brooks Blakely (born September 8, 1951) is a literary editor and agent. She is the president of Brooks Permissions, a permissions firm that manages the use of literary works by Gwendolyn Brooks and other authors.

She has made public appearances and appeared in documentaries related to Chicago's literary scene, especially the Black Arts movement which grew out of Chicago's Woodlawn neighborhood.

Personal life 
She is the daughter of poet Gwendolyn Brooks and her husband, Henry Lowington Blakely Jr., who was known as "the Poet of 63rd Street".

References 

American businesspeople
1951 births
Living people
American literary editors